Hister quadrimaculatus is a beetle of the family Histeridae.

References

Histeridae
Beetles described in 1758
Taxa named by Carl Linnaeus